Víctor Manuel Román y Reyes (13 October 1872 – 6 May 1950) was the President of Nicaragua from 15 August 1947 to his death on 6 May 1950. His Vice President was  Mariano Argüello Vargas, a former Foreign Minister and President of the Senate of National Congress of Nicaragua.

Román was the president of the upper chamber of National Congress of Nicaragua 1929–1930.

Víctor Manuel Román y Reyes also called T.V. (Tio Victor) was designated by General Assembly, coup d'etat. He practiced former Nicaraguan president Zelaya's military philosophy. Zelaya's philosophy was based on former German Emperor military views.  T.V. was a member of Somoza's Liberal Nationalist Party and after his death, his niece's husband Anastasio Somoza Garcia was then appointed to move forward with T.V.'s military.

President Víctor Manuel Román y Reyes died in Philadelphia. In his death bed, surrounded by his grandson, family and few fellow politicians including the secretary of the presidency (chief of staff) Alejandro del Carmen. Roman y Reyes signed the Liberal and Conservative Coalition Agreement of Nicaragua. It was he, who helped the minority enter Congress.

References 

1872 births
1950 deaths
Presidents of Nicaragua
Presidents of the Senate (Nicaragua)
Nationalist Liberal Party politicians
Foreign Ministers of Nicaragua
Knights Grand Cross of the Order of Isabella the Catholic
People from Carazo Department